The Akron Zips football statistical leaders are individual statistical leaders of the Akron Zips football program in various categories, including passing, rushing, receiving, total offense, defensive stats, and kicking. Within those areas, the lists identify single-game, single-season, and career leaders. The Zips represent the University of Akron in the NCAA's Mid-American Conference.

Although Akron began competing in intercollegiate football in 1891, the school's official record book considers the "modern era" to have begun in 1954. Records from before this year are often incomplete and inconsistent, and they are generally not included in these lists.

These lists are dominated by more recent players for several reasons:
 Since 1954, seasons have increased from 10 games to 11 and then 12 games in length.
 The NCAA didn't allow freshmen to play varsity football until 1972 (with the exception of the World War II years), allowing players to have four-year careers.
 Bowl games only began counting toward single-season and career statistics in 2002. The Zips have played in three bowl games since this decision, giving many recent players an extra game to accumulate statistics. These games include the 2005 Motor City Bowl, and there is a large uptick in players achieving entires on this list around the 2005 season

These lists are updated through the end of the 2019 season. The latest Akron media guide does not list a full top 10 for most touchdown scoring records.

Passing

Passing yards

Passing touchdowns

Rushing

Rushing yards

Rushing touchdowns

Receiving

Receptions

Receiving yards

Receiving touchdowns

Total offense
Total offense is the sum of passing and rushing statistics. It does not include receiving or returns.

Total offense yards

Touchdowns responsible for
"Touchdowns responsible for" is the NCAA's official term for combined passing and rushing touchdowns.

Defense

Interceptions

Tackles

Sacks

Kicking

Field goals made

References

Akron